Verticordia × eurardyensis, commonly known as Eurardy magenta, is a flowering plant in the myrtle family, Myrtaceae and is endemic to a small area in the south-west of Western Australia. It is a shrub similar to both Verticordia dichroma and Verticordia spicata which grow in the same area and is thought to be a stable hybrid between those two species. It has mostly egg-shaped leaves and spike-like groups of dark magenta-coloured flowers which fade to straw-coloured, in late spring and early summer.

Description
Their margins are slightly hairy or have minute teeth.

Flowering time is from October to December. The plants appear to be a stable hybrid between two verticordia species - V. dichroma and v. spicata, both of which occur in the same area.

Taxonomy and naming
Verticordia × eurardyensis was first formally described by Elizabeth and Alex George in 1994 from a specimen collected from Eurardy Reserve. The description was published in Nuytsia. The specific epithet (× eurardyensis) is derived from the location where the species is found.

George placed this species in subgenus Eperephes, section Pennuligera along with V. comosa, V. chrysostachys, V. lepidophylla, V. aereiflora, V. dichroma, V. muelleriana, V. argentea, V. albida, V. fragrans, V. venusta, V. forrestii, V. serotina, V. oculata, V. etheliana and V. grandis.

Distribution and habitat
This verticordia grows in sand in low heath and shrubland. It only occurs in Eurardy Reserve, a former pastoral station north of Kalbarri National Park in the Geraldton Sandplains biogeographic region.

Conservation
Verticordia × eurardyensis is classified as "Priority One" by the Western Australian Government Department of Parks and Wildlife, meaning that it is known from only one or a few locations which are potentially at risk.

Use in horticulture
Only a few specimens of Verticordia × eurardyensis have been propagated and only in Kings Park Botanic Garden.

References

eurardyensis
Rosids of Western Australia
Eudicots of Western Australia
Plants described in 1994
Plant nothospecies